The European Banking Federation is a trade association representing national banking associations in  countries of the European Union and the European Free Trade Association. It represents over 3500 banks and about 2.6 million employees. It was established in 1960.

Members 

In November 2022 the members were:
Austria - The Austrian Bankers' Association
Belgium - Febelfin
Bulgaria - Association of Banks in Bulgaria
Croatia - Croatian Banking Association
Cyprus - Association of Cyprus Commercial Banks
Czech Republic - Czech Banking Association
Denmark - Finance Denmark - FD 
Estonia - The Estonian Banking Association 
Finland - The Federation of Finnish Financial Services
France - French Banking Federation
Germany - Bundesverband deutscher Banken 
Greece - The Hellenic Bank Association
Hungary - The Hungarian Banking Association
Iceland - Icelandic Financial Services Association
Ireland - Irish Banking Federation
Italy - Italian Banking Association
Latvia - Association of Latvian Commercial Banks
Liechtenstein - Liechtenstein Bankers Association
Lithuania - Association of Lithuanian Banks 
Luxembourg - The Luxembourg Bankers' Association
Malta - Malta Bankers' Association
Netherlands - Dutch Banking Association
Norway - Finance Norway - FNO
Poland - Polish Bank Association
Portugal - Portuguese Banking Association
Romania - Romanian Banking Association
Slovakia - Slovak Banking Association
Slovenia - The Bank Association of Slovenia
Spain - The Spanish Banking Association
Sweden - The Swedish Bankers' Association 
Switzerland - Swiss Bankers Association
United Kingdom - British Bankers' Association

Eleven countries had associate status: Albania, Andorra, Armenia, Azerbaijan, Bosnia and Herzegovina, North Macedonia, Moldova, Monaco, Montenegro, Serbia and Turkey.

See also

Association for Financial Markets in Europe
EONIA
EURIBOR
European Central Bank
European Financial Services Roundtable
Inter-Alpha Group of Banks

References

International banking institutions
Banking organizations